Mulmets Viser is the second album from the Danish folk/Viking metal band Svartsot.

Track listing
"Thelred" - 3:32
"Lokkevisen" - 3:45
"Havfruens Kvad" - 4:05
"Højen på Glødende Pæle" - 3:58
"På Odden af Hans Hedenske Sværd" - 5:07
"Laster og Tarv" - 3:38
"Den Svarte Sot" - 6:16
"Kromandens Datter" - 3:55
"Grendel" - 2:52
"Jagten" - 4:29
"Lindisfarne" - 3:51
"I Salens Varme Glød" - 5:36

Limited edition bonus tracks
"Visen om Tærskeren" - 4:39
"Den Døde Mand" - 5:56

Credits
 Thor Bager - Vocals
 Cristoffer J.S. Frederiksen - lead guitar, mandolin, acoustic guitar
 Cliff Nemanim - Rhythm guitars
 James Atkin - Bass
 Danni Jelsgaard - Drums
 Hans-Jørgen Martinus Hansen - Irish whistles, mandolin, Accordion, bodhran and other instruments

2010 albums
Svartsot albums
Napalm Records albums